Chiefdom of Sizhou, ruled by the Tian clan, was an autonomous Tusi chiefdom established by Tian Zongxian during the Sui dynasty. After he conquered the Qianzhong area (present-day eastern Guizhou Province), Tian Zongxian was recognized as the hereditary ruler of the region by the Sui court in 582.

Sizhou, Bozhou, Shuidong and Shuixi were called "Four Great Native Chiefdom in Guizhou" by Chinese.  "Liangguang [ruled by] Cen and Huang, Sizhou and Bozhou [ruled by] Tian and Yang", an idiom current among Southwestern Mandarin speakers, proved that the Tian clan was once one of the most powerful clans in Southwestern China.

Origin
The Tian clan claimed to be descendants of Han Chinese in their genealogy book; however the authenticity needed to be verified. Modern scholars stated that Tian Zongxian was either Han Chinese or Tujia.

History
The Chiefdom of Sizhou was established during the Sui dynasty when the first chieftain Tian Zongxian occupied Qianzhong area (黔中, modern-day eastern Guizhou) in southwest China. It lasted for about 831 years over 26 generations through the Sui, Tang, Song, Yuan, and Ming dynasties.

In 1107, Sizhou chieftain Tian Yougong acquiesced Song dynasty's overlordship, Sizhou came under the Chinese jimi system. In 1273, Sizhou surrendered to Yuan dynasty and came under the Chinese tusi system.

In 1364,  declared its independence from Sizhou. Tian Mao'an, the Sinan chieftain, swore allegiance to Ming Yuzhen, while Sizhou came under Zhu Yuanzhang's tusi system. Sizhou attacked Sinan in 1367, killed Tian Mao'an's two sons, disturbed his ancestors' tombs. Tian Mao'an died soon after this battle, his successor Tian Renzhi switched allegiance to Ming court, Zhu Yuanzhang ordered them to cease fire.

However, the two clans had been feuding ever since, they were waging an endless war. Sizhou attacked Sinan in 1411, Tian Zongding, the Sinan chief, was defeated and fled to Ming court for help. Five thousand Ming troops under general Gu Cheng marched towards Sizhou and had it conquered. Tian Chen, the last Sizhou chieftain, was captured and executed in Beijing. Later, Tian Zongding was also found guilty (matricide) and executed in 1413. In the same year, Guizhou Province was created, both Sizhou and Sinan were fully annexed into the central bureaucratic system of the Ming dynasty.

List of Sizhou chieftains
Below are Sizhou chieftains

References

 
Tusi
History of Guizhou
Qiandongnan Miao and Dong Autonomous Prefecture
States and territories established in the 580s
States and territories disestablished in the 1410s